The Bridgeville Elementary School District is a school district in Bridgeville, California. It offers classes from kindergarten through grade 8, in a portion of eastern Humboldt County, California.  It operates the Bridgeville School in Bridgeville.

References

External links
 

School districts in Humboldt County, California